José Maurício may refer to:

Full name:
José Maurício (Portuguese composer) (1752-1815)

Portuguese first name:
José Maurício Nunes Garcia, Brazilian composer
José Maurício Bustani, diplomat

See also
Spanish first name without accent on Maurício:
José Mauricio Parra, Venezuelan footballer